Uromunna is a genus of isopod crustaceans.

Genera

The genus contains the following species:

Uromunna acarina 
Uromunna biloba 
Uromunna brevicornis 
Uromunna cananeia 
Uromunna caribea 
Uromunna deodata 
Uromunna eora 
Uromunna hayesi 
Uromunna humei 
Uromunna jejuensis 
Uromunna mediterranea 
Uromunna mundongensis 
Uromunna naherba 
Uromunna nana 
Uromunna peterseni 
Uromunna petiti 
Uromunna phillipi 
Uromunna powelli 
Uromunna reynoldsi 
Uromunna rhamnda 
Uromunna samariensis 
Uromunna santaluciae 
Uromunna schauinslandi 
Uromunna serricauda 
Uromunna sheltoni 
Uromunna similis 
Uromunna tenagoika 
Uromunna ubiquita

References

Asellota